Íñigo Elosegui Momeñe (born 6 March 1998 in Zierbena) is a Spanish cyclist, who currently rides for UCI ProTeam .

His grandfather José Antonio Momeñe was also a professional cyclist.

Major results
2016
 National Junior Road Championships
3rd Road race
3rd Time trial
2018
 1st  Road race, National Under–23 Road Championships
2019
 4th Time trial, National Under–23 Road Championships

References

External links

1998 births
Living people
Spanish male cyclists
Sportspeople from Biscay
People from Greater Bilbao
Cyclists from the Basque Country (autonomous community)
Competitors at the 2018 Mediterranean Games
Mediterranean Games competitors for Spain
21st-century Spanish people